German Embassy School New Delhi (DSND, is a German international school in Chanakyapuri, New Delhi. It has kindergarten, primary school, and secondary school levels.

References

External links
 German School New Delhi
 German School New Delhi 

German
Delhi
New Delhi
International schools in India
Germany–India relations